Natural Law is a 7 episode series, created by Edgar Medina and Rui Cardoso Martins, directed by João Nuno Pinto and produced by Arquipélago Films, with Margarida Vila-Nova and Nuno Lopes in the main roles. The soundtrack is composed by Justin Melland. The series premiered January 5th 2022, on RTP1.

Synopsis 
After the murder of a local student, a small town judge faces an unexpected dilemma: now her actions can put her family at risk.

Reception 
The crime drama “Natural Law” premiered its first episode at the event ONSeries Lisbon, the first international television networking event to be held in Portugal, on November 24, 2021, at the Centro Cultural de Belém (CCB), in Lisbon.

The show premiered on national television started on January 5 until February 16, on RTP1. The series has been received with critical acclaim, and praised for its technical and narrative quality, as well as recognized for its international potential.“Everything (...) is shrouded in doubt, between the twists and turns of this thriller, first a crime drama, then judicial, then a family drama, and in part coming-age as well. Brilliantly contained. Enough is enough. Nothing more is necessary.” in Newspaper Novo Semanário.

“What was originally a show set primarily in courtrooms, with a criminal case per episode, became something much more intricate. To write the seven episodes of Natural Law, the authors extracted freely many details from true courtroom stories, “which is why the dialogue sounds so real” in Visão (Magazine)  

“The cinematography is top-notch. The mise-en-scène, aerial shots and abandoned buildings – shooting occurred in the Caldas da Rainha area – join together in a suspenseful, nerve- wracking spectacle, with a cadence defined by American composer Justin Melland’s soundtrack (...).”, in Observador (Newspaper) 

“ (. . . ) This series is a collection of impressions taken from a particular place, and of a cast of characters. All are involved in an ambiance that is as written as it is filmed, set to music and photographed. Natural Law benefits from the juxtaposition of the physical space with the psychological state of the characters.” in Público (Newspaper) 

“There is a series that lights the way for the future of national television production: “Natural Law (...) “But the most important thing is that “Natural Law” is one of the most solid steps towards the realization of a national creative model, which differentiates us from the fiction of other creative poles. It is in their own identity, without being locked in a room, that the doors are opened to genuinely national production. Which can be international.” in Jornal de Negócios (Newspaper).

Cast 

 Margarida Vila-Nova as Ana Martins 
 Nuno Lopes as Detective Mário 
 Ivo Canelas as Prosecutor Vítor
 Maria Rueff as Alice 
 António Fonseca as Judge Luciano
 Catarina Wallenstein as Detective Maria
 Afonso Laginha as David 
 Sílvia Chiola as Clara
 Adriano Carvalho as Prosecutor Abel
 Ana Vilela da Costa as Journalist Marta
 Ana Valentim as Attorney Joana
 Gonçalo Waddington as Attorney Renato
 Miguel Borges as Park Guard
 Pedro Lacerda as Ruço 
 Leandro Paulin as Tozé
 João Figueiredo as Johny
 Ivo Arroja as Hugo

Additional Cast 

 Margarida Caldeira as Inês
 Diogo Nobre as André S. Gomes
 Margarida Moreira as Laura  (André’s mother)   
 Manuel Wiborg as Guilherme (André’s father)   
 João Lagarto as Attorney Melo  
 João Pedro Mamede as Attorney Sousa 
 Joana Bárcia as Prostitute Simone 
 Mitó as Prostitute Celeste 
 João Pamplona as Cameraman 
 Lourenço Henriques as Professor Lemos 
 Nuno Nunes as Professor Chaves 
 Maria do Ó as Martinha 
 Rui Luís Brás as Priest 
 Susana Blazer as Maria da Conceição 
 Maria João Vaz as Clerk Júlia 
 Miguel Monteiro as Clerk João
 António Mortágua as Rookie’s Owner
 Jorge Magalhães as Producer Arsénio 
 Nuno Sá as Restaurant Owner 
 Ana Bento as Kiki 
 João Garcia Miguel as Mourita Owner
 Nuno Preto as Kidnapper
 António Simão as Policeman Witness 1
 Madalena Aragão as Mariana 
 Maria Abreu as Mizé 
 Sara Barros Leitão as Mónica 
 Ivo Alexandre as Carlos Manuel 
 Gustavo Sumpta as Coroner
 Marta Medeiros as Clara Teacher
 Diana Herzog as Helena 
 Rui Cardoso Martins as Judge Mateus
 Helder Ramos as Taxi Driver Lacerda 
 João Tempera as Nurse Pedro 
 Nicolas Brites as Baby’s Uncle
 Dinarte Branco as Plaintiff Figueiredo 
 Vanda Cerejo as Baby’s Mother
 Luís Barros as Policeman Witness 2

References 

Portuguese-language television shows
Portuguese television series
2022 Portuguese television series debuts